The Sault Ste. Marie Solar Park near Sault Ste. Marie, Ontario, Canada, in 2011 became Canada's second largest photovoltaic plant with an installed capacity of 68 MWp.

In 2009, Ontario introduced a feed-in tariff for renewable energy payments program paying up to CDN 44.3 cents per kilowatt-hour (kW·h) for large ground arrays such as Sault Ste. Marie. This makes Ontario's one of the top feed in tariff programs in the world. All of the power produced will be sold for CDN 42 cents per kW·h for the first 20 years.

Consisting of six 10 MW Ac projects, the first two were completed, by the POD Generating Group, in October, 2010, the Baseline Road Facility on the west side of the city, also known as SSM1, using 87,000 Q.BASE modules from Q-Cells. The project was acquired by Starwood Energy, in June, 2010. The remainder of the project was completed by Q-Cells. SSM2 is 30 MW Ac, and SSM3 is 10 MW Ac, both near Black Road on the east side of Sault Ste Marie. The total electricity peak demand for Sault Ste. Marie is 90-100 MW in summer and 140-150 MW in winter. The instantaneous demand is displayed on the SSM PUC website. The project was completed in 2011, with about 270,000 panels. Energy generated from each of the three stations will be sold to SSM PUC through 20 year Power Purchase Agreements using Ontario Power Authority's Renewable Energy Standard Offer Program.

8 km northwest is the Prince Township Wind Farm, Canada's 3rd largest wind farm, rated at 189 MW, which along with 203 MW of hydroelectricity, further makes Sault Ste. Marie a green city.

See also

List of solar farms in Canada

References

Buildings and structures in Sault Ste. Marie, Ontario
Solar power stations in Ontario
Energy infrastructure completed in 2011
2011 establishments in Ontario